Ash Chandler is an Indian actor, comedian, and singer who has appeared in English, Hindi and Tamil-language films. He is known for his stand-up comedy.

Filmography 

 Television
Premi (1997) (Tamil) as Inspector Ashwin
The Man's World Show (2006) as host
2nd South Indian International Movie Awards (2013) as host

References

External links 

English male television actors
Male actors in Hindi cinema
Male actors in Tamil cinema
Indian stand-up comedians
Indian male film actors
Year of birth missing (living people)
Living people
21st-century Indian male actors